Violet Pauline King Henry (October 18, 1929 – March 30, 1982) was the first black woman lawyer in Canada, the first black person to graduate law in Alberta and the first black person to be admitted to the Alberta Bar. She was also the first woman named to a senior management position with the American national YMCA.

Early life
King studied at Crescent Heights High School, where she was president of the Girls Association in grade 12 and had her yearbook captioned with her unusual intention to study criminal law.  She started at the University of Alberta in 1948, joining the feminist Blue Stocking Club (modelled after the Blue Stockings Society), serving as Vice-President of the Students Union and the representative of the Students’ Union to the National Federation of Canadian University Students.  She became class historian for her final year and was the Alberta representative to the International Student Services Conference in Hamilton in 1952.  To finance her studies, she taught piano.  An active student, King was one of just four students to receive an Executive "A" gold ring at Color Night, the university's annual celebration of student contributions to the university – the other three students were future premier Peter Lougheed, Ivan Head (future advisor to Pierre Trudeau), and lawyer Garth Fryett.

Legal studies
When King started her law degree, there were just three women in a class of 142.
King graduated with her law degree at the University of Alberta in 1953 and was admitted to the Alberta bar in 1954. At the time, these accomplishments were reported prominently by newspapers, including The Calgary Herald, The Albertan, and The Edmonton Journal.

Ties to African-American settlement in Alberta
King's father John and his extended family moved to Amber Valley, Alberta in 1911, as part of a group of African American farmers migrating from Oklahoma to Alberta, both as part of the Great Migration and to avoid racist laws.  They settled in Keystone, Alberta (now Breton, Alberta) southwest of Edmonton.  They came to Canada as part of a Canadian government campaign to entice Southern US farmers to the Canadian Prairies, although Clifford Sifton's plan had expected white settlers.

King's parents, John and Stella, moved to Calgary in 1919, where her father worked as a porter and her mother worked as a seamstress. Many African Americans, including her father, worked as porters in Canada. Both of her parents were considered important members of the Calgary community of black persons. When she graduated, the Brotherhood of Sleeping Car Porters, a key player in the civil rights movement, gave significant attention to her achievements and both the union's president and vice president travelled from New York and Detroit to make a presentation to her in Calgary.

Career
King practiced criminal law in Calgary, articling with E.J. McCormick. She later moved to Ottawa, around 1956, to join the federal civil service in a senior administrative role at Citizenship and Immigration Canada, where she was promoted twice. She served during the time that Ellen Fairclough was named Canada's first woman member of cabinet and Minister of Immigration. By 1962, the Department had taken major steps to eliminate racism and respect the new Bill of Rights.

In 1963, King moved to the United States, working in executive roles for the YW/YMCA in Newark, New Jersey and Chicago, Illinois, gaining prominence for helping African Americans find work. In 1976, she was appointed Executive Director of the national Council of YMCA’s Organizational Development Group, becoming the first woman named to a senior management position with the American national YMCA.

In 1965 King married Godfrey C. Henry, a Trinidadian-American and graduate of Columbia University's Graduate School of Political Science, and they lived in Newark, NJ.  In 1966 King-Henry gave birth to her only child, daughter Jo-Anne Henry.

King was 52 when she died of cancer in New York City in 1982.

She was featured in the documentary, Secret Alberta: The Former Life of Amber Valley by filmmaker Cheryl Foggo in 2017; King was a bridesmaid at Foggo's mother's wedding.

References

Black Canadian women
Canadian women lawyers
20th-century Canadian lawyers
African-American women lawyers
African-American lawyers
YMCA leaders
Canadian people of African-American descent
People from Calgary
University of Alberta alumni
Canadian emigrants to the United States
1929 births
1981 deaths
People from Amber Valley, Alberta
20th-century American women lawyers
20th-century American lawyers
20th-century Canadian women
20th-century African-American women
20th-century African-American people